Tovmas Terzian (born Istanbul, Ottoman Empire, October 21, 1840 – February 8, 1909) was an Armenian poet, playwright, and professor.

Biography 
Tovmas Terzian was born to an Armenian father and an Italian mother. After attending the local Mekhitarist school, he attended the Murad-Raphaelian school in Venice, Italy on the San Lazzaro Island from which he graduated in 1858. Upon returning to Constantinople, he dedicated himself to teaching. He taught at Nersesian, Nubar-Shahnazarian, and Getronagan. His students included famous Armenians such as Reteos Berberian, Minas Cheraz, Yeghia Demirdjibashian, Krikor Zohrab, Yerukhan, and other writers and teachers. Tovmas Terzian was fluent in English, Armenian, French, Italian, Classical Greek, Latin, Turkish, and Greek.

Works 

Tovmas Terzian is famed mainly for his poetry and plays. His most important play being, Arshak II (1871) which was loosely based on the life of the 4th century Armenian king Arshak II. The play written in both Italian and Armenian was intended as an opera libretto. The music for this opera was composed by the Armenian composer Dikran Tchouhadjian who used the Italian version of the play Arsace II.
Terzian never saw his play on stage either in its operatic form or as a straight play. The Soviet version of the opera Arshak II which first appeared on stage in 1941 at the Yerevan Opera House was a big success. However, beyond the title and names of some of the characters, it had very little in common with Terzian's play.

References 

19th-century poets from the Ottoman Empire
20th-century poets from the Ottoman Empire
Armenian-language writers
Educators from the Ottoman Empire
Writers from Istanbul
1840 births
1909 deaths
San Lazzaro degli Armeni alumni
Armenians from the Ottoman Empire
19th-century male writers
Armenian-language poets
People from the Ottoman Empire of Italian descent